The 2016–17 Ukrainian Football Amateur League season was the 21st since it replaced the competition of physical culture clubs. The competition started on 13 August 2016.

There were two groups with 12 teams in Group A and 12 teams in Group B. The last season winner FC Balkany Zorya has participated in professional Second League.

On 29 August 2016, SC Tavriya Simferopol was admitted to the competition.

Teams
 Debut: FC Oskar Pidhiria, FC Nyva Terebovlya, FC Avanhard Koryukivka, FC Viktoriya Mykolayivka, FC Kvadro Pervomaiskyi, FC Inhulets-3 Petrove, FC Metalist 1925 Kharkiv
 Newly admitted former professional clubs: FC Lviv, FC Kovel-Volyn, FC Chortkiv-Peduniversytet, SC Tavriya Simferopol
 Returning clubs: MFC Pervomaisk

Withdraw teams
List of clubs that took part in last year competition, but chose not to participate in the 2016–17 season.
 FC Voloka
 FC Vinnytsia
 FC Avanhard Kakhovka
 FC Kryvbas Kryvyi Rih
 FC Kolos Khlibodarivka

Location map

Group 1

Top goalscorers
The top goalscorers are:

Group 2

Top goalscorers
The top goalscorers are:

Championship final
Winners of groups have qualified for the championship final. According to the regulations, in case if the winner refuse to participate or was excluded, it will be replaced with a team that placed the next in the final standings tournament table.

The match was interrupted in the 84th minute after Kharkiv fans invaded the pitch and the referees and players walked off.

Promotions to the Second League
Conditions to participate in the 2017–18 Ukrainian Second League:
 No less than one season spent in football competitions of a regional football federation;
 Participated the 2016–17 Ukrainian football championship among amateurs for the whole season and placed in the final standings table no lower than the eight;
 Club received required attestation.

On 18 November 2016, a representative of the FFU Executive Committee confirmed receiving applications from SC Tavriya Simferopol, FC Metalist 1925 Kharkiv, FC Hirnyk Sosnivka, FC Nyva Ternopil, FC Ahrobiznes Volochysk, FC Lviv, and MFC Zhytomyr.

On 21 June 2017, six teams have been promoted to the 2017–18 Ukrainian Second League, including all abovementioned besides renamed FC Rochyn Sosnivka which have decided to play again in the Amateur League in the next season.

See also
 2016–17 Ukrainian Amateur Cup

References

External links
AAFU
2016-17 Regulations. AAFU website.

Ukrainian Football Amateur League seasons
4
Uk